In Islamic philosophy, the qalb, or heart, is the origin of intentional activities, the cause behind all humans' intuitive deeds. While the brain handles the physical impressions, qalb (the heart) is responsible for deep understanding within the sadr (the chest). Heart and brain work together, but it is the heart where true knowledge can be received.

In Islamic thought, the heart is not the seat of feelings and emotions, but of rūḥ: the immortal cognition, the rational soul.

Qalb (قَلْب) literally means to turn about. So what is the connection between “turn about” and “the heart”? When something turns about, it does not remain the same and so does our heart. Our feelings and thoughts change all the time and that is why it is called Qalb (قَلْب).

In the Quran, the word qalb is used more than 130 times.

Stages of taming qalb

Qalb also refers to the second among the six purities or Lataif-e-sitta in Sufi philosophy.
To attend Tasfiya-e-Qalb, the Salik needs to achieve the following sixteen goals.
Zuhd or abstention from evil
Taqwa or God-consciousness
War' a or attempt to get away from things that are not related to Allah.
Tawakkul or being content with whatever Allah gives
Sabır or patience regarding whatever Allah Subhanahu wa ta'âlâ does
Şukr or gratefulness for whatever Allah gives
Raza or seeking the happiness of Allah
Khauf or fear of Allah's wrath
Rija or hope of Allah's blessing
Yaqeen or complete faith in Allah
Ikhlas or purity of intention
Sidq or bearing the truth of Allah
Muraqabah or total focus on Allah
Khulq or humbleness for Allah
Dhikr or remembrance of Allah
Khuloot or isolation from everyone except Allah

References

See also
Lataif-e-sitta
Nafs
Ruh
Sufism

Heart
Sufi philosophy
Arabic words and phrases
Islamic belief and doctrine
Sufi psychology